Teona Bakradze (born January 24, 1996) is a Georgian football forward. She is a member of the Georgian national team. She is playing in the Turkish Women's Super League for Amed S. F.K. with jersey number 24.

Club career 

She played for FC Hereti Lagodekhi in Georgia, before she moved to Turkey in November 2016, and joined Kdz. Ereğlispor to play in the Turkish Women's First Football League.

In the 2018–19season, she transferred to the newly promoted First League club Hakkarigücü Spor.

For the 2021–22 Women's Super League season, Bakradze transferred to |Çaykur Rizespor. After one season, she signed with the Diyarbakır-based club Amed S. F.K..

International career 
Bakradze appeared for Georgia women's national football team in four matches at the UEFA Women's Euro 2017 qualifying Group 6 in 2016 and in three matches at the 2019 FIFA Women's World Cup qualification – UEFA preliminary round Group 1 in 2017.

International goals

Career statistics

References

External links 

1996 births
Living people
People from Samegrelo-Zemo Svaneti
Women's footballers from Georgia (country)
Women's association football forwards
Georgia (country) women's international footballers
Expatriate women's footballers from Georgia (country)
Expatriate sportspeople from Georgia (country) in Turkey
Expatriate women's footballers in Turkey
Karadeniz Ereğlispor players
Hakkarigücü Spor players
Turkish Women's Football Super League players
Çaykur Rizespor (women's football) players
Amed S.K. (women) players